The Peepul Centre is an arts centre in Belgrave, Leicester. Designed by Andrzej Blonski Architects, the £15 million building was opened in 2005 and houses an auditorium, restaurant, cyber café, gym and dance studio, and is also used for conferences and events. The centre hosted Prime Minister Gordon Brown and other senior Labour Party figures during hustings for the deputy leadership contest.

Founded by the Belgrave Baheno Women's Organisation the project was conceived in the 1990s. A few months after its opening, the centre faced financial difficulties in 2007.
 There are plans for expansion to include an aqua spa and recording studio.

References

External links 
 
Profile from Building Design online

Buildings and structures in Leicester
Culture in Leicestershire